Ficlatuzumab is a humanized monoclonal antibody designed for the treatment of cancers.

It is a humanized monoclonal antibody that binds to hepatocyte growth factor, thus inhibiting the c-MET receptor signaling cascade.

Ficlatuzumab was developed by AVEO Pharmaceuticals.  In May 2012, AVEO released results of a Phase II clinical trial comparing gefitinib alone and in combination with ficlatuzamab in treatment-naive Asian patients with non-small cell lung cancer.

References 

Monoclonal antibodies